Bocharov Ruchey is the summer residence of the President of Russia. It is located in the Tsentralny City District of Sochi, Russia.

The Bocharov Ruchey residence was commissioned by the People's Commissar for Military and Naval Affairs, Kliment Voroshilov, and completed in 1955. Miron Merzhanov was the project architect, while Sergei Venchagov was the landscape designer.

References

1955 establishments in the Soviet Union
Official residences in Russia
Buildings and structures in Sochi